Ramah Presbyterian Church and Cemetery is a historic Presbyterian church and cemetery located near Huntersville, Mecklenburg County, North Carolina. The current church sanctuary was built in 1881, and is a rectangular, gable-front vernacular Greek Revival / Italianate style frame building. It is three bays wide and has segmental-arched, double-hung sash windows and a tall rectangular and segmental-arched louvered vent. Also on the property is a one-story, log Fellowship Building built in 1935. The cemetery contains approximately 500 burials, with the oldest dating to about 1800.

It was added to the National Register of Historic Places in 1991.

References

External links
Official website
Cemetery video

Presbyterian churches in North Carolina
Cemeteries in North Carolina
Protestant Reformed cemeteries
Churches on the National Register of Historic Places in North Carolina
Greek Revival church buildings in North Carolina
Italianate architecture in North Carolina
Churches completed in 1881
19th-century Presbyterian church buildings in the United States
Churches in Mecklenburg County, North Carolina
National Register of Historic Places in Mecklenburg County, North Carolina
Wooden churches in North Carolina
1881 establishments in North Carolina
Italianate church buildings in the United States